The Lebanese Second Division is the second division of Lebanese football. It is controlled by the Lebanese Football Association. The top two teams qualify for the Lebanese Premier League and replace the relegated teams, while the bottom two are relegated to the Lebanese Third Division. The league was initially scheduled to start in September, before being postponed to 2 October as part of preventive measures by the state towards the COVID-19 pandemic.

It is the first season to feature a "split" format, where the season is divided into two phases. In the first phase, each club plays against each other once, for a total of 11 matchdays. In the second phase, the league is split into two halves – the "top six" and the "bottom six". Points are carried over from the first phase, and each club plays five games within its own half. Due to the COVID-19 pandemic, all games in the season were played behind closed doors.

As the 2019–20 season was cancelled, Sporting and Ansar Howara were the promoted teams from the Third Division, while Bekaa and Racing Beirut were relegated from the Lebanese Premier League. Sporting and Sagesse finished in first and second place respectively, and were promoted to the Lebanese Premier League, whereas Nasser Bar Elias and Ansar Howara finished in the bottom two positions, and were relegated to the Lebanese Third Division.

Teams

League table

Top scorers

References 

Lebanese Second Division seasons
Lebanon
2
Lebanese Second Division, 2020-21